Can Arat (born 21 January 1984) is an Armenian-Turkish footballer. He plays as a center back.

Club career
Arat played 74 times for the Fenerbahçe PAF team, scoring two goals. He became a regular in the squad following Fábio Luciano's injury at the start of the 2006–07 season, but lost to new transfers Diego Lugano and Edu Dracena four weeks later. Arat joined İstanbul Büyükşehir Belediyespor in 2009.

International career
Arat has been called up to the Turkish national football team for the Euro 2008 qualifying group matches. He made his international debut for senior team on 12 April 2006 against Azerbaijan national football team.

He also played 5 matches for national Olympic team in 2005 Mediterrean Games and won the silver medal.

Honours

Fenerbahçe
 Süper Lig: 2006–07
 Turkish Super Cup: 2007

References

External links
 Player Profile at TFF.org 
 Guardian Stats Centre

1984 births
Living people
Turkish people of Armenian descent
Turkish footballers
Turkey international footballers
Turkey B international footballers
Turkey under-21 international footballers
Association football central defenders
Fenerbahçe S.K. footballers
Sivasspor footballers
Karşıyaka S.K. footballers
İstanbul Başakşehir F.K. players
Süper Lig players
Turkey youth international footballers
People from Kadıköy
Footballers from Istanbul
TFF First League players
Mediterranean Games silver medalists for Turkey
Mediterranean Games medalists in football
Competitors at the 2005 Mediterranean Games